Joan Stewart may refer to:
 Joan Beaufort, Queen of Scots, married James Stewart, the Black Knight of Lorn
 Joan Stewart, Countess of Morton, daughter of James I, King of Scotland
 Joan Hinde Stewart, American academic administrator